Mariovo and Prilep rebellion was the first recorded Slavonic Christian uprising in Ottoman North Macedonia, that took place in 1564–65. Leaders included Dimitri(ja) Stale (or Tale) from Satoka, priest Dimitri(ja) from Gradešnica, Matjo (or Mato) Nikola from Belište, Stojan Pejo and priest Jakov from Staravina.

References

Conflicts in 1564
Conflicts in 1565
1564 in Europe
1565 in Europe
1560s in the Ottoman Empire
Ottoman period in the history of North Macedonia
Rebellions against the Ottoman Empire
Prilep Municipality
Novaci Municipality